The Air Transportation Stabilization Board (ATSB) is an office of United States Department of the Treasury created to assist US airlines in the wake of the September 11, 2001 attacks.

The Air Transportation Safety and System Stabilization Act, signed into law September 22, 2001, authorizes the board to issue up to $10 billion in federal loan guarantees to air carriers for which credit is not otherwise available and where "such agreement is a necessary part of maintaining a safe, efficient and viable commercial aviation system in the United States."

Loan guarantees
Between 2001 and 2003, the ATSB approved applications for loan guarantees from seven carriers: America West Airlines, US Airways, American Trans Air, Aloha Airlines, Frontier Airlines, Evergreen International Airlines, and World Airways. These carriers accepted loan guarantees worth $1.179 billion.  Ultimately, the government benefited from the program, drawing $300 million in profit. 

The ATSB denied applications from nine carriers: Ozark Airlines dba Great Plains Airlines, MEDjet International, Corporate Airlines, Gemini Air Cargo, Frontier Flying Service, Spirit Airlines, National Airlines, and both initial and revised applications from United Airlines and Vanguard Airlines.

ATSB Results

Successes
America West Airlines - Survives, repays ATSB loans with interest. America West management team takes over US Air during US Air's bankruptcy becoming US Airways, stock symbol LLC. Goes on to merge with American Airlines during American Airlines bankruptcy again with America West CEO W. Douglass Parker and his former America West Airlines team at the helm of the new American Airlines.

Still in Business and holding on in life support
Frontier Airlines - reorganizes after a chapter 11 bankruptcy filing and is acquired by Republic Airways Holdings and then the private investment group Indigo Partners.

Casualties
Aloha Airlines - shut down in a chapter 7 bankruptcy filing.
American Trans Air - acquired by the private equity firm MatlinPatterson's Global Aero Logistics and shut down in chapter 7 bankruptcy filing.
Evergreen International Airlines  
World Airways - acquired by the same group as ATA and also shut down by the same private equity firm

References

External links
U.S. Treasury - Air Transportation Stabilization Board  
GAO: State Of the U.S. Commercial Airline Industry and Possible Issues for Congressional Consideration

United States Department of the Treasury
Aviation in the United States
2001 establishments in the United States
Aftermath of the September 11 attacks